The Women's road time trial at the 2008 Summer Olympics took place on August 13 at the Urban Road Cycling Course. Of the 25 women competing in the event, the medal hopefuls included Karin Thürig (Switzerland), Judith Arndt and Hanka Kupfernagel (Germany), Marianne Vos (Netherlands), Christiane Soeder (Austria), and road race gold medalist Nicole Cooke (Great Britain).

Cyclists started at two-minute intervals on the course, 
They competed against the clock rather than in a direct race against the cyclists.

Kristin Armstrong of the USA won the event in under 35 minutes, finishing 24.29 seconds ahead of Emma Pooley of Great Britain.  Armstrong's average speed was 40.445 km/h (25.1 mph).

Result

See also
2007 UCI Road World Championships - Women's Time Trial

References 

Road cycling at the 2008 Summer Olympics
Cycling at the Summer Olympics – Women's individual time trial
2008 in women's road cycling
Women's events at the 2008 Summer Olympics